Joseph Hopkinson (November 12, 1770January 15, 1842) was a United States representative from Pennsylvania and a United States district judge of the United States District Court for the Eastern District of Pennsylvania.

Education and career

Born on November 12, 1770, in Philadelphia, Province of Pennsylvania, British America, Hopkinson received an Artium Baccalaureus degree in 1786 from the University of Pennsylvania, an Artium Magister degree in 1789 from the same institution and read law in 1791, with William Rawle and James Wilson. He was admitted to the bar and entered private practice in Philadelphia and Easton, Pennsylvania from 1791 to 1814.

Notable cases

In 1795, Hopkinson defended the men charged with treason in their rebellion against a federal whiskey tax. In 1799, he successfully represented Dr. Benjamin Rush in a libel suit against journalist William Cobbett. He was counsel for Justice Samuel Chase in his impeachment trial before the United States Senate in 1804 and 1805.

Congressional service

Hopkinson was elected as a Federalist from Pennsylvania's 1st congressional district to the United States House of Representatives of the 14th United States Congress. He was reelected to the succeeding Congress and served from March 4, 1815, to March 3, 1819. He was not a candidate for reelection in 1818.

Later career

Following his departure from Congress, Hopkinson resumed private practice in Philadelphia from 1819 to 1820, in Bordentown, New Jersey from 1820 to 1823, and in Philadelphia from 1823 to 1828. He was a member of the New Jersey General Assembly from 1821 to 1822.

Notable cases

In 1819, Hopkinson argued several landmark constitutional cases before the United States Supreme Court, including Dartmouth College v. Woodward, Sturges v. Crowninshield and McCulloch v. Maryland. He was associated with Daniel Webster during the Dartmouth College case.

Federal judicial service

Hopkinson received a recess appointment from President John Quincy Adams on October 23, 1828, to a seat on the United States District Court for the Eastern District of Pennsylvania vacated by Judge Richard Peters. He was nominated to the same position by President Adams on December 11, 1828. He was confirmed by the United States Senate on February 23, 1829, and received his commission the same day. His service terminated on January 15, 1842, due to his death in Philadelphia. He was interred in the old Borden-Hopkinson Burial Ground (now Christ Church Episcopal Cemetery) in Bordentown.

Notable case

Hopkinson's 1833 opinion in Wheaton v. Peters established the foundations of modern American copyright law.

Other service and activities

Hopkinson was Chairman of the Pennsylvania constitutional convention in 1837. He was secretary of the board of trustees of the University of Pennsylvania in 1790 and 1791, and a trustee from 1806 to 1819, and from 1822 to 1842. His civic and cultural activities included service as President of the Pennsylvania Academy of the Fine Arts and as Vice-President of the American Philosophical Society (elected in 1815).

Composition

Hopkinson wrote the anthem Hail, Columbia in 1798.

Family

Hopkinson was the son of Francis Hopkinson, a signer of the Declaration of Independence, a member of the Continental Congress and the first United States District Judge for Pennsylvania. In 1794, he married the daughter of Governor of Pennsylvania Thomas Mifflin.

References

Bibliography
 Konkle, Burton Alva. Joseph Hopkinson, 1770-1842, Jurist-Scholar-Inspirer of the Arts: Author of Hail Columbia. Philadelphia: University of Pennsylvania Press, 1931.

Sources

 
 The Political Graveyard
 Biography and portrait at the University of Pennsylvania

External links

 
 The Hopkinson Family Papers, including correspondence, documents and printed materials relating to Joseph Hopkinson and other family members, are available for research use at the Historical Society of Pennsylvania.

1770 births
1842 deaths
Politicians from Philadelphia
American people of English descent
Federalist Party members of the United States House of Representatives from Pennsylvania
Members of the New Jersey General Assembly
Judges of the United States District Court for the Eastern District of Pennsylvania
United States federal judges appointed by John Quincy Adams
United States federal judges admitted to the practice of law by reading law
Pennsylvania lawyers
Politicians from Burlington County, New Jersey
Songwriters from Pennsylvania
National anthem writers
19th-century American judges
University of Pennsylvania alumni